J.P. "Peter" Kwint (born 19 December 1984) is a Dutch politician, currently serving as a Member of Parliament for the Socialist Party.

References

1984 births
Living people
21st-century Dutch politicians
Leiden University alumni
Members of the House of Representatives (Netherlands)
Municipal councillors of Amsterdam
People from Graafstroom
People from Sliedrecht
Socialist Party (Netherlands) politicians
Vrije Universiteit Amsterdam alumni
20th-century Dutch people